The international scale of river difficulty is an American system used to rate the difficulty of navigating a stretch of river, or a single (sometimes whitewater) rapid. The scale was created by the American Whitewater Association to evaluate rivers throughout the world, hence international in the title. 
It should not be confused with the internationally used whitewater scale, which is published and adapted by a committee of the International Canoe Federation (ICF). 
The grade reflects the technical difficulty and skill level required associated with the section of river.  The scale is of use to various water sports and activities, such as rafting, riverboarding, whitewater canoeing, stand up paddle surfing, and whitewater kayaking.

Classification
There are six categories, each referred to as grade or class followed by a number. The scale is not linear, nor is it fixed. For instance, there can be difficult grade twos, easy grade threes, and so on. The grade of a river may (and usually does) change with the level of flow. Often a river or rapid will be given a numerical grade, and then a plus (+) or minus (-) to indicate if it is in the higher or lower end of the difficulty level.

While a river section may be given an overall grading, it may contain sections above that grade, often noted as features, or conversely, it may contain sections of lower graded water as well. Details of portages may be given if these pose specific challenges.

A summary of river classifications as presented by the American Whitewater Association:

Caution in application
Classifications can vary enormously, depending on the skill level and experience of the paddlers who rated the river.  For example, at the 1999 International Conference on Outdoor Recreation and Education, an author of a paddling guide pointed out that there is too much variation in what is covered by the Class I designation, and proposed making further distinctions within the Class I flat water designations and Class I+ moving water designations, with the goal of providing better information for canoeists, instructors leading trips, and families with young children.

The grade of a river or rapid is likely to change along with the level of the water. High water usually makes rapids more difficult and dangerous, although some rapids may be easier at high flows because features are covered or washed out. At spate/flood stage, even rapids which are usually easy can contain lethal and unpredictable hazards. Conversely, some rapids may be easier with lower water levels when dangerous hydraulics become easier to manage. Some rivers with high volumes of fast moving water may require little maneuvering, but will pose serious risk of injury or death in the event of a capsize.

See also
 Degree of difficulty

References

Canoeing and kayaking
Hazard scales
Paddling
Rating systems
Whitewater sports